Fahs or FAHS may refer to:

People 
 Sophia Lyon Fahs (1876–1978), American editor, author, teacher, and religious activist
 Edgar Fahs Smith (1854 – 1928), American scientist

Places 
 Air Force Base Hoedspruit, an airbase of the South African Air Force
 El Fahs, in Tunisia
 Fahs-Anjra, a prefecture Morocco

Schools 
 Fairview Alternative High School, Roseville, Minnesota, United States
 Fleetwood Area High School, Fleetwood, Pennsylvania, United States
 Frankfurt American High School,  Frankfurt, Germany
 Franklin Academy High School, part of Franklin Academy, Wake Forest, North Carolina
Feilding High School, Feilding, New Zealand

See also
 FAH (disambiguation)